Bromeliohyla, sometimes known as the bromeliad treefrogs, is a genus of frogs in the family Hylidae. This genus was erected in 2022 following a major revision of the Hylidae. The original two species in this genus were previously placed in the genus Hyla. They are found in tropical southern Mexico, Belize, Guatemala, and northern Honduras.

Species 
The genus contains three species:

References

 
Hylinae
Amphibian genera
Amphibians of Central America
Amphibians of North America
Taxa named by Jonathan A. Campbell
Taxa named by Darrel Frost